The Etching Club (also known as Etching Club, the London Etching Club, and the British Etching Club; or the Junior Etching Club for its younger membership grouped separately) was an artists' society founded in London, England, in 1838 by Charles West Cope. The club published illustrated editions of works by authors such as Oliver Goldsmith, Shakespeare, John Milton and Thomas Gray. It effectively ceased to exist in 1878.

Membership

Richard Ansdell
Thomas Oldham Barlow
Charles West Cope (1811–1890)
Thomas Creswick
William Charles Thomas Dobson
Edwin Austin Forbes (1839–1895) (Honorary member)
William Edward Frost
Francis Seymour Haden
James Clarke Hook
John Callcott Horsley
William Henry Hunt
William Holman Hunt
John Everett Millais
George B. O'Neill
Samuel Palmer
Richard Redgrave (1804–1888)
Frank Stone
John Frederick Tayler (1806–1889)
Henry James Townsend (1810–1890)
Thomas Webster

Publications of The Etching Club
Oliver Goldsmith. The Deserted Village (Joseph Cundall, 1855 - first pub. 1841).
Oliver Goldsmith. The Vicar of Wakefield.
Bolton Corney. Goldsmith's poetical works (1845).
William Shakespeare. Songs of Shakespeare (1843).
William Shakespeare. The Ballads of Shakespeare (1852).
John Milton. L'Allegro and Il ponseroso  (1849). 
Thomas Gray. Elegy written in a country churchyard (1847).
The Etching Club. Etched thoughts (1844)
The Etching Club. Etchings For The Art-Union Of London by The Etching Club (London: Art Union of London, 1857).
The Etching Club. A selection of etchings by the etchings club (Joseph Cundall, 1865).

Publications of the Junior Etching Club
Junior Etching Club. Passages from Modern English Poets (Forty-Seven Etchings) (London: William Tegg, 1875); Alaric Alexander Watts.

References and bibliography

Cope, H. W. "Reminiscences of Charles West Cope, R. A." (London: Bentley, 1891) p. 35 ff.
Ray, Gordon Norton. The Illustrator and the Book in England from 1790 to 1914 Dover Publications, 1992) p. 139 ff.
Lang, Gladys Engel & Lang, Kurt. Etched in memory: the building and survival of artistic reputation (University of Illinois Press, 2001) p. 37 ff. 
Fredericksen, A. The Etching Club of London: a taste for painters' etchings (exhibition catalogue, 2002).

External links

The Etching Club.

British artist groups and collectives
Organizations established in 1838
1838 establishments in England
Arts organizations established in the 1830s
Etching